Abderhalden is a Swiss surname. Notable people with the surname include:

Emil Abderhalden (1877–1950), Swiss biochemist
Rolf Abderhalden (born 1965), Colombian artist and theatre director
 Heidi Abderhalden (born 1962), Swiss-Colombian artist and theatre director

See also
Marianne Kaufmann-Abderhalden (born 1986), Swiss alpine skier
15262 Abderhalden, a Themis asteroid
Abderhalden–Kaufmann–Lignac syndrome
Abderhalden reaction, developed by Emil Abderhalden

Swiss-German surnames